Law on planning popularly known as Planloven, is a Danish law which establishes the basic rules that public authorities shall follow when planning, including:

the protection of the country's nature and environment through prevention of pollution
to create and maintain valuable buildings
to involve the public in planning

Plan Types
Planloven contains four different plan types:

National directives
Regional plans
Municipality plans
Local plans

The various plans are ranked so that a plan of a given type may not conflict with plans on a higher level. It is only the local plan that is binding for the individual landowners.

External links 
 Retsinformation - Law on planning (Danish)
 Retsinformation - Guide to Planloven (Danish)
 PlansystemDK - Plans after Planloven (Danish)

Law of Denmark
Urban planning in Denmark